Time-based authentication is a special procedure to prove an individual's identity and authenticity on appearance simply by detecting its presence at a scheduled time of day or within a scheduled time interval and on a distinct location.

To enable time-based authentication, a special combination of objects is required. 
 Firsthand, the individual that applies for being identified and authenticated has to present a sign of identity.
 Secondly, the individual has to carry at least one human authentication factor that may be recognized on the distinct time and in a certain location.
 Thirdly, the distinct time must be equipped with a resident means that is capable to determine the appearance or passage or otherwise coincidence of individual at this distinct location.

Distinctiveness of locating 

It makes no sense to define a starting time or a time span without constraint of location. No granting of access is known without defining a distinct location where this access shall be granted. Basic requirement for safe time-based authentication is a well defined separation of locations as well as an equally well defined proximity of the applying individual to this location.

Applications 

 Time-based authentication is a standard procedure to grant access to an area by detecting a person at an entrance an opening the barrier at a certain time. This of course does not limit the presence of the person in the entered area after once passing the barrier.
 Time-based authentication is a standard procedure to get access to a machine, especially a working position with a computer and the functions of this computer within a certain span of time. Such granted access may be automatically terminated.

See also 
 Authentication
 Two factor authentication
 Location-based authentication
 Real-time locating
 Security token
 Wireless

Time-based
Security